The Korea Institute for Advancement of Technology (KIAT) is a quasi government-public institute under the Korean Ministry of Trade, Industry and Energy. Formed in May 2009, the main functions of KIAT include analyzing and formulating Korean R&D and industrial policy, acting as an industrial technology innovation funding agency, creating Korea's industrial and technological ecosystem, and fostering international technological cooperation. KIAT has an annual budget of circa one billion dollars, and employs 257 staff. (2012)

History 
KIAT was formed in May 2009 by the merger and consolidation of six previous Korean government and public institutes: ITEP (Korea Institute of Industrial Technology Evaluation and Planning), KOTEF (Korea Industrial Technology Foundation), KTTC (Korea Technology Transfer Center), IITA (Institution for Information Technology Advancement), KMAC (Korea Materials and Components Industry Agency), and KIDP (Korea Institute of Design Promotion).

KIAT Presidents

Project Funding and grants 
In 2012, KIAT distributed circa US$940m in technology project grants and R&D funding.

Events 
KIAT is responsible for organizing numerous annual technology, R&D, and collaboration events. These include the tech+ forum and Eureka day events.

tech+ forum 

The Tech Plus Forum ('tech+ forum') has been held since 2009 in Korea. It is a 'knowledge concert' that gathers leading experts in innovation and inspiration to discuss themed-topics over the course of a two-day event. The name Tech+ is derived from technology, economy, culture and humanity. In 2012, tech+ was held under the theme of ‘dream@technology'.

Eureka Day 
EUREKA is a  pan-European collaborative R&D network that was established in 1985. It currently has 41 full member countries  and Korea is an associate member. KIAT acts as the EUREKA NCP (National Contact Point) for Korea, and since 2011 has held an annual Eureka day event to advance Korea-European cooperation and innovation via matchmaking and seminars.

References

Notes 
Reference #4. Figures derived and calculated from Korean government official statistics, Knowledge Economy Committee, Korean National Assembly, accessed Jan 09, 2013.

External links 
 Homepage (Korean)
 Homepage (English)
 techplus forum (English)
 KIAT's Global Partnership Program (English)
 Eureka Day(English)
 Ministry of Trade, Industry and Energy (English)

Technology strategy
Technology development
Innovation organizations
Innovation economics
Knowledge transfer
Organizations based in Seoul